Paches is a genus of skippers in the family Hesperiidae.

Species
Recognised species in the genus Paches include:
 Paches exosa Butler, 1877
 Paches liborius Plötz, 1884
 Paches loxus Westwood, [1852]
 Paches mutilatus Hopffer, 1874

References

Natural History Museum Lepidoptera genus database

Pyrgini
Hesperiidae genera
Taxa named by Frederick DuCane Godman
Taxa named by Osbert Salvin